William Franklin "Bill" Baber (born January 17, 1979 in Charlottesville, Virginia) is a former tight end in the National Football League who played on 3 rosters in 4 seasons.

Collegiate career 
After playing prep football at Western Albemarle High School, Baber played collegiate for the nearby Virginia Cavaliers.

Pro career 
He was selected in the fifth round with the 141st overall pick of the 2001 NFL Draft by the Kansas City Chiefs. Baber played in just one game during his rookie season. In 2002, he started 2 of the 12 games that he played in, recording 2 receptions for ten yards and 1 touchdown. The following year, he played all 16 games but made just one reception for 20 yards. In November 2004, the Chiefs waived Baber. The San Diego Chargers acquired him, but he did not see action. Finally, he played his last game, in 2004, for the Tampa Bay Buccaneers, recording 1 reception for 7 yards.

References

1979 births
American football tight ends
Kansas City Chiefs players
Living people
Sportspeople from Charlottesville, Virginia
Virginia Cavaliers football players
Tampa Bay Buccaneers players